Sviyazhsk (Zöya) is a rural locality (a selo) in the Republic of Tatarstan, Russia, located at the confluence of the Volga and Sviyaga Rivers. It is often referred to as an island since the 1955 construction of the Kuybyshev Reservoir downstream at Tolyatti, but it is in fact connected to the mainland by a causeway. 

In 2017 the Assumption Cathedral and Monastery were added to the list of UNESCO World Heritage Sites.

Sviyazhsk was founded in 1551 as a fortress, which was built within four weeks from parts made in Uglich and transported down the Volga. It became a military base of the Russian army during the siege of Kazan (1552).

Since the 18th century, Sviyazhsk served as a center of an uyezd. In 1920–1927, it was a center of Sviyazhsky Kanton; in 1927–1931—the administrative center of Sviyazhsky District. In 1932, it was demoted to rural status.

There is a school and a club in Sviyazhsk, as well as a monastery associated with the name of Macarius of Unzha.

Another way to get there is by a boat from the port of Kazan. In summer every day at 08:30 a fast boat departs at pier 8, and at 09:00 a slow boat. Tickets can be bought on the spot near the kassa.

Historical population
1989:  747 (Russians - 66%, Tatars - 27%)
2000: 258

References

 

Rural localities in Tatarstan
Sviyazhsky Uyezd
Defunct towns in Russia
Populated places established in 1551
World Heritage Tentative List
1551 establishments in Russia
Islands of the Volga River